The Xperia X1 (codenamed HTC Kovsky) is a high-end smartphone from Sony Ericsson, and is the first in the manufacturer's Xperia series. The phone was designed and built by Taiwanese OEM HTC. The X1 was first presented at the 2008 Mobile World Congress.

Basics
The X1 is an arc-slider phone with the Windows Mobile 6.1 operating system. It is Sony Ericsson's first mobile phone to feature Windows Mobile. The device also has a Java virtual machine (JBed) and supports Java Platform, Micro Edition that is claimed to have a richer set of features than typically available.

The phone features a three-inch resistive touchscreen overlaying a keypad which emerges when the user slides the touchscreen face upward, much as in the HTC TyTN II, although the X1's touchscreen slides out in an arc. Its touchscreen is a 65,536-color TFT WVGA display. It has a 3.2-megapixel digital camera which records video at thirty frames per second in VGA (640×480) quality. There is also a secondary front-facing camera for videoconferencing that is of QCIF format. Connectivity options for the phone include: mini-USB; wireless LAN 802.11b/g; Bluetooth 2.0 with A2DP, FTP, and HID; EDGE; and quad-band GSM, UMTS, HSDPA, HSUPA, and HSCSD. The X1 has 512 MB of internal memory (400 MB free), which is expandable to 16 gigabytes using high capacity microSD cards, currently cards up to 32 gigabytes have been released by SanDisk. The phone also features A-GPS for navigation.

The X1 ships with Opera Mobile pre-installed.

Standard features on the X1 include push email, an RSS feed aggregator, and handwriting recognition.

It is also able to use the GSM network feature Alternate line service.

The device is powered by Qualcomm's ARM 11 MSM7200A CPU, which runs at 528 MHz. The device's memory is 256 MB RAM.

Panel interface
The home screen on the Xperia X1 supports up to nine different "panels" which can be switched between by the user, each offering different functionality. This allows users to select exactly which functionality they want on their homescreen, and switch easily. Extra panels can be downloaded from Sony Ericsson or third parties. Sony Ericsson released an SDK for developers which allows panels to be created using either C++ or HTML with Microsoft Visual Studio 2005 SP1 or better. There is also a third party website which simplifies the process of creating an HTML panel, as it is quite a complex task with Visual Studio.

Release date
The X1 began shipping on 30 September 2008. It became available to the UK market on 27 October 2008 (only on Vodafone). The handset is available through the Carphone Warehouse and Phones4U in the UK. In Europe it will be sold only in Fnac stores (Belgium and France).

In Hong Kong, X1 was shipped on 29 October 2008. The first batch of X1 in Hong Kong was dedicated for the mobile operator Three HK and was reserved for the operator's VIP premium user for pre-ordering.

In South Africa, it was released to the public on 16 December 2009.

On 13 November, Sony Ericsson announced that the phone would be available in North America on 28 November 2008 for $799 unlocked.

In Australia, the X1a was released on Telstra in December 2008 and went on sale 26 December 2008. It's now also available on the Vodafone and 3 Networks.

The Sony Ericsson Canadian website reveals the X1a as "coming soon", available within three months. The availability status was spotted as early as 14 February 2010.

Specifications

Display
3" resistive touchscreen with a resolution of 800×480 pixels (WVGA)
65 thousand color TFT display

Device colors
The phone is available in two colors
Solid Black
Steel Silver

Physical attributes
Dimensions: 110.0 × 53.0 × 16.7 millimeters; 4.33 × 2.09 × 0.66 inches
Weight with battery: 158.0 grams; 5.57 ounces

Battery
Lithium-Polymer, 1500 mAh.

Talk time:
GSM: 10h
WCDMA: 6h
WCDMA video call: 3h

Stand by:
GSM: 20.8 days
WCDMA: 20.7 days

Connectivity
The Xperia X1 supports an always-on 3G broadband Internet connection with high-speed data transfer. This enables audio and video streaming, web surfing, multimedia messaging and email.

Connectivity options include:
3.5G broadband
HSDPA with download transfer rate up to 7.2 Mbit/s
HSUPA with upload transfer rate up to 2.0 Mbit/s
Wi-Fi
Bluetooth, with a range of 10 meters
GPRS modem for dial-up Internet
Synchronization and content sharing with PCs
USB mass storage
USB cable support

Software features
Windows Mobile operating system
Microsoft Outlook Mobile: email, contacts, calendar, tasks
Microsoft Office Mobile: Word, Excel, PowerPoint
Opera Mobile
Windows Media Player Mobile
Windows Live
Exchange ActiveSync
Voice control
Utility Applications: file explorer, calculator, pictures & video, notes

The XDAndroid project makes it possible to run Android on some Windows Mobile phones, including the Xperia X1.
Additionally, the Rhobuntu project makes it possible to run Ubuntu Linux on some Windows Mobile phones, including the Xperia X1.

Storage
Internal memory: up to 400 MB

microSD memory card support up to 16 GB

Networks
Quad-band GSM / GPRS / EDGE: GSM 850 / 900 / 1800 / 1900
Tri-band UMTS / HSDPA / HSUPA: UMTS 850 / 1900 / 2100 X1a, UMTS 900 / 1900 / 2100 X1i/X1c
SAR value: 0.57 W/kg

Publicity
The launch of the Xperia X1 was accompanied by a video called "Who is Johnny X?".

The launch was tied in closely with the "London Design Festival".

See also
Technological convergence

References

External links
Xperia X1
Product Home Page
Feature List 
Xperia X1 at WikiSpecs
Xperia X1 White Paper
Reuters Update

X
Mobile phones with an integrated hardware keyboard
Mobile phones introduced in 2008
Mobile phones with user-replaceable battery
Slider phones